TouchToolkit is a software development kit to simplify the complexities of multi-touch application development and testing. The framework currently supports WPF 4.0 and Silverlight 4.0. The key features of TouchToolkit are:

 A domain-specific language to define new gestures including multi-user, multi-touch scenarios.
 A device independent architecture that allows the application to run on different devices without any change in application code.
 A test framework that allows to write unit tests to validate touch interactions and gesture definitions.
 A record/playback tool for simulating multi-user scenarios as well as testing & debugging applications

TouchToolkit is a free and open source software under GNU Library General Public License (LGPL).

Underlying Technology 
The core framework is written in C# for Microsoft .NET 4.0 and Silverlight 4.0. The toolkit uses MGrammar to parse the gesture definition language (GDL). More technical details can be found here

History 
TouchToolkit is developed in Agile Software Eng. Lab. at University of Calgary as part of a Masters research project. The research is conducted by Shahedul Huq Khandkar under the supervision of Dr. Frank Maurer.

Developers 
 Shahedul Huq Khandkar
 Teddy Seyed
 Andy Phan

External links
http://ase.cpsc.ucalgary.ca/
http://touchtoolkit.codeplex.com

Multi-touch
Widget toolkits
Software development kits